
Jozef Turanec (7 March 1892 Sučany – 9 March 1957, Leopoldov) was a Slovak General during World War II. He was also a recipient of the Knight's Cross of the Iron Cross of Nazi Germany. Jozef Turanec served as a general in the Slovak Invasion of Poland. He held partial command of the Slovak Fast Division and helped in the command of the expeditionary force during Operation Barbarossa. Turanec was a skilled commander and received the Iron Cross after a Slovak success in the Battle of Rostov in December 1941.

Awards

 Knight's Cross of the Iron Cross on 7 August 1942 as Major General and commander of the Slovak Fast Division

References

Citations

Bibliography

 

1892 births
1957 deaths
People from Martin District
Slovak military personnel of World War II
Slovak people of World War II
Recipients of the Knight's Cross of the Iron Cross
Czechoslovak military personnel of World War II
Slovak people who died in prison custody
Slovak Roman Catholics